Caner Topçu (born 25 June 1997) is a Turkish actor.

Life and career 
Caner Topçu was born on 25 June 1997 in Istanbul to a family from Kastamonu. He graduated from Industrial Vocational High School. He is studying in logistic department of Istanbul Arel University.He showed interest in acting and received acting lessons from Harun Özer and Fulya Filazi. During this period, he was cast in many theatre plays, including Beyaz Cehennem, Dikkat İnternet Var, Sarıkamış and İnançtan Zafere.

In 2015, he made his cinematic debut with the movie Bilinçsizler, portraying the character of Recep. He is best known for his role as İlyas Reis in the historical TV drama Barbaroslar: Akdeniz'in Kılıcı and as Kanat Günay in the teen drama series Duy Beni.

Filmography

Series

Film

References

External links 
 
 

1997 births
Living people
Turkish male film actors
Turkish male television actors
Male actors from Istanbul